Sporting Clube de Braga, commonly known as Sporting de Braga or just Braga, is a Portuguese sports club from the city of Braga. It is best known for the professional football team playing in the Primeira Liga, the top flight of Portuguese football at the Estádio Municipal de Braga.

Founded on 19 January 1921, Braga are nicknamed, Braguistas, and Os Arsenalistas (The Arsenalists) for the shirt colour that resembles English club Arsenal. Since 2003, Braga have played their home matches at the Estádio Municipal de Braga, which replaced the Estádio 1º de Maio, now used for the club's reserve team. Unlike most European sporting entities, Braga's members (sócios) have owned and operated the club throughout its history.

In the 2000s, Braga became one of Portugal's most decorated clubs (7th) after the Big Three and has had some success in European competitions, winning the last UEFA Intertoto Cup (the only Portuguese club to do so) in 2008, and reaching the final of the UEFA Europa League in 2011, cultivating the reputation of being regarded as the fourth strongest club in Portugal, outside of the Big Three. Domestically, they have also won another 6 domestic trophies: three Taça de Portugal in 1965–66, 2015–16, and in 2020–21, and the Taça da Liga twice in 2012–13 and 2019–20. Braga have a long-standing rivalry with nearby club Vitória de Guimarães, with whom they contest the Derby do Minho.

The club qualified for the 2010–11 UEFA Champions League, reaching the competition for the first time in their history, by eliminating Celtic and Sevilla following a 2nd place finish in the 2009–10 Primeira Liga season. This represented the highest finish in the league in the club's history. Moreover, in the 2010s, Braga have cultivated a reputation for spotting and developing young talent, and have remained focused on developing a youth system.

History
Braga changed their kits from green and white to their current red and white during the 1945–46 season (for the reserve squad) and the 1946–47 season (for the first team). The change, according to one version of the story, was at the behest of their president, José Antunes Guimarães, who had business connections in London and was an Arsenal fan; according to an alternate version, it was József Szabó, Braga's Hungarian coach, who asked the president to change the green and white uniform to an Arsenal-style red and white. In 1947, Braga won the Second division title in the new kit, reaching the First division for the first time. Braga even renamed their youth team Arsenal de Braga. 

Braga's emblem is the city of Braga's shield with Mother Mary and baby Jesus with the blue from the city's shield changed to red. On the top of the emblem is the golden Mural Crown of Braga, with the name "Sporting Clube de Braga" on it. Many Braga fans have said that Mother Mary gives them luck. The fans of Braga are known as Arsenalistas due to their team home kit that resembles that of English club Arsenal. They are also known as Bracarenses because of being from the city of Bracari, later named Bracara Augusta, city of Portugal that is now known as Braga.

Aside from the loyalty of its supporters, the Minho derby against Vitória de Guimarães is a match that both sets of fans eagerly await. This match is more than football – it is a way people from the north view each city. The derby is one of Portugal's most intense matches, and children under 13 are restricted from entering unless an adult is with them. The rivalry goes back to when the City of Braga was the ancient capital of Gallaecia and the largest Portuguese city by the time the Kingdom of Portugal was formed by Afonso I of Portugal. At that time, Guimarães became the seat of the King and nobility, whereas the city of Braga remained the centre of trade and religious power (the largest city and seat of the Archbishop).

In the 1960s and 1970s, Braga began to climb up the league ladder and eventually participated in the UEFA competitions. Braga's recent run of successive European participations began in the 2004–05 UEFA Cup after finishing fifth in the league under Jesualdo Ferreira's first full season in the club.  In the 2006–07 UEFA Cup, the side reached the last 16 before a 6–4 aggregate loss to Tottenham Hotspur. That summer, the club signed a three-year sponsorship deal with French insurance company Axa, who took over the naming rights for the stadium for €4.5 million; this was renewed for a further three years in 2010.

Braga won the 2008 UEFA Intertoto Cup and again reached the UEFA Cup last 16 in the 2008-09 season, where they lost by a single goal to Paris Saint-Germain. 

Braga was runners-up in the league for the only time in its history in the 2009-10 season under Domingos Paciência. Entering the UEFA Champions League for the first time, in the fourth qualifying round Braga beat Sevilla 1–0 at home and 4–3 away, thus making the group stage. On 15 September 2010, Braga were heavily defeated 6–0 by Arsenal in its first group stage match. Eliminated in third place, they dropped into the Europa League and reached the final in Dublin, where they lost to a goal by FC Porto's Radamel Falcao.

Braga won the Taça da Liga for the first time in 2013 under José Peseiro, with one goal from Alan against Porto. Two years later, Sérgio Conceição's side lost on penalties to Sporting CP in the Taça de Portugal final, but Paulo Fonseca's triumphed over Porto on the same method in 2016 to win their first such cup in 50 years.

In 2019–20, Braga went through four managers over the course of the season. The second of these, Rúben Amorim, led them to a league cup victory over Porto, with Ricardo Horta scoring in added time to secure the trophy on home soil.

On 28 July 2020, Carlos Carvalhal was announced as the new head coach, after 14 years away from the club. He led the club to the league cup final again, where they lost to Amorim's new team Sporting, but won the 2021 Taça de Portugal Final 2–0 against Benfica. He would leave the club and be replaced by Artur Jorge after the 2021–22 season ended. 

On 10 October 2022, 21.67% of the club shares were bought for €80 million by Qatar Sports Investments (QSI), a subsidiary of Qatar Investment Authority (QIA), the state-run sovereign-wealth fund in Qatar owned by Tamim bin Hamad Al Thani, the Emir of Qatar, who is also the owner of Ligue 1 side Paris Saint-Germain through the QSI.

League and cup history

Recent seasons

Honours

National

League
Segunda Divisão
 Winners: 1946–47, 1963–64

Cups
Taça de Portugal
 Winners: 1965–66, 2015–16, 2020–21
Taça da Liga
Winners: 2012–13, 2019–20
Taça Federação Portuguesa de Futebol
 Winners (1): 1976–77

International
UEFA Intertoto Cup
 Winners: 2008

European record

Overview
As of 23 February 2023.

Matches

Players

Current squad

Out on loan

Former players

Club staff

Managerial history

References

External links

 Official website 
 FootballLineups team profile
 Braga News at PSNL Soccer

 
Football clubs in Portugal
Braga, S.C.
1921 establishments in Portugal
Taça de Portugal winners
Primeira Liga clubs
Companies listed on Euronext Lisbon
Sport in Braga
B